The River Plate Basin University (in Spanish: Universidad de la Cuenca del Plata - UCP) is a non-profit private university founded in 1991. Located in the province of Corrientes, Argentina, it has an undergraduate enrollment of 1,100 students and a graduate enrollment of 600.

The university is focused primarily on social sciences and engineering. The undergraduates majors available are accountancy, business administration, law, humanities.

See also
The Latin American Docta
Science and Education in Argentina
Argentine Higher Education Official Site

Private universities in Argentina
Universities in Corrientes Province
Educational institutions established in 1991
1991 establishments in Argentina